Suleiman Al-Saeed (born 8 August 1996) is a Saudi Arabian professional footballer who plays as a winger for Al-Hazem.

Career
Al-Saeed started his career at the youth teams of Al-Nassr and was called up to the first team for the first time in November 2015. He left Al-Nassr without making a single appearance in July 2018. On 30 September 2018, Al-Saeed joined Saudi Second Division side Al-Sadd. In August 2019, Al-Saeed left Al-Sadd and joined MS League side Al-Taqadom. He made 26 appearances and scored twice as Al-Taqadom were relegated to the Second Division. On 15 October 2020, Al-Saeed joined MS League side Al-Diriyah. He scored 8 goals in 35 appearances for the club. On 2 July 2021, Al-Saeed joined newly promoted Pro League side Al-Hazem. He made his debut on 12 August 2021 in the 3–3 draw against Al-Taawoun. On 9 January 2022, Al-Saeed joined Al-Diriyah on loan until the end of the season.

References

External links
 
 

1996 births
Living people
Saudi Arabian footballers
Association football wingers
Saudi Second Division players
Saudi First Division League players
Saudi Professional League players
Al Nassr FC players
Al-Sadd FC (Saudi football club) players
Al-Taqadom FC players
Al-Diriyah Club players
Al-Hazem F.C. players